The Pandaruan Bridge or Brunei–Malaysia Friendship Bridge (Malay: Jambatan Pandaruan or Jambatan Persahabatan Brunei–Malaysia) is a bridge at the border of Brunei and Malaysia. The bridge crosses the Pandaruan River between Temburong and Limbang. The bridge replaced the ferry service between two countries and was officially opened on 8 December 2013 by the Malaysian Prime Minister, Najib Tun Razak, and the Sultan Hassanal Bolkiah of Brunei.

References

Bridges in Sarawak
Bridges in Brunei
Bridges completed in 2013
Box girder bridges
Brunei–Malaysia border crossings